"Perdón, Perdón" is the lead single of the live album Primera Fila: Hecho Realidad by American duo Ha*Ash. The single was officially released on September 22, 2014. The music video of the song is the live performance in Estudios Churubusco, Mexico City, on 7 July 2014. The song then included on their live album Ha*Ash: En Vivo (2019). It was written by Ashley Grace, Hanna Nicole and José Luis Ortega.

Background and release 
"Perdón, perdón" was written by Ashley Grace, Hanna Nicole and José Luis Ortega and produced by George Noriega, Tim Mitchell and Pablo De La Loza. It was recorded by Ha*Ash for their live album Primera Fila: Hecho Realidad. It was released as the lead single from the album on September 22, 2014, by Sony Music Entertainment.

Commercial performance 
The track peaked at number 17 in the Latin Pop Songs, number 36 in the Hot Latin songs and at number 35 in the Latin Airplay charts in the United States. In Mexico, the song peaked at number one on the Mexican Singles Chart and Monitor Latino. In 2017, it was announced that "Perdón, Perdón" had been certified Triple Platinum. In June 2019, the songs was certified as Quadruple Platinum in Mexico.

Music video 
A music video for "Perdón, Perdón" was released on October 27, 2014. It was directed by Nahuel Lerena. The video was filmed in Estudios Churubusco. , the video has over 720 million views on YouTube.

The second video for "Perdón, Perdón", recorded live for the live album Ha*Ash: En Vivo, was released on December 6, 2019. The video was filmed in Auditorio Nacional, Mexico City.

A remix video featuring Mexican group Los Ángeles Azules was released on June 8, 2018. The video was filmed in Convento San Miguel Arcángel, Maní, Yucatán.

Credits and personnel 
Credits adapted from AllMusic.

Recording and management

 Recording Country: México
 Sony / ATV Discos Music Publishing LLC / Westwood Publishing
 (P) 2014 Sony Music Entertainment US Latin LLC

Ha*Ash
 Ashley Grace – vocals, guitar, songwriting
 Hanna Nicole – vocals, guitar, piano, songwriting
Additional personnel
 Pablo De La Loza – chorus, production
 José Luis Ortega – songwriting
 Paul Forat – A&R. programming, production
 Ezequiel Ghilardi – bass
 Gonzalo Herrerias – A&R
 George Noriega – producer
 Tim Mitchell – producer

Charts

Certifications

Awards and nominations

Release history

References 

Ha*Ash songs
Songs written by Ashley Grace
Songs written by Hanna Nicole
Songs written by José Luis Ortega
Song recordings produced by George Noriega
Song recordings produced by Tim Mitchell
2014 singles
2014 songs
Spanish-language songs
Pop ballads
Sony Music Latin singles
2010s ballads
Monitor Latino Top General number-one singles